Odd Arne Engh (born 14 April 1951) is a Norwegian Nordic combined skier.

He was born in Fåberg, and represented the club Søre Ål IL. He competed at the 1980 Winter Olympics in Lake Placid.  He was Norwegian champion in 1973.

References

1951 births
Living people
Sportspeople from Lillehammer
Norwegian male Nordic combined skiers
Olympic Nordic combined skiers of Norway
Nordic combined skiers at the 1980 Winter Olympics
20th-century Norwegian people